Eucosma catharaspis is a species of moth of the family Tortricidae. It is found in China (Jilin, Shanghai, Henan, Anhui), Korea, Japan and Russia.

References

Moths described in 1922
Eucosmini